Muger may refer to:
 Muger, Dana
 Muger, Gachsaran
 Muger, Landeh